Seemi Aizdi is a Pakistani politician and the member-elect of the Senate of Pakistan.

Political career
She was elected to the Senate of Pakistan from Punjab province on a reserved seat for women representing Pakistan Tehreek-e-Insaf. The election was held on 15 November 2018 between her and Saira Afzal Tarar of Pakistan Muslim League (N).

References

Living people
Pakistan Tehreek-e-Insaf politicians
Politicians from Punjab, Pakistan
Year of birth missing (living people)